Sarasota High School is a public high school of the Sarasota County Public Schools in Sarasota, Florida, United States, a city on the Gulf of Mexico coast south of Tampa. The school colors are black and orange and the mascot is a sailor.

History

Old Sarasota High School

Architecture
Old Sarasota High School was designed by architect M. Leo Elliott in 1926. The school was completed in 1927 and the first senior class graduated in 1928. 

Made of red brick and glazed terra cotta, the Late Gothic Revival building was set on a high base of limestone and concrete laid in imitation of limestone. It has three stories with a 4½-story entrance tower building. The rectangular, irregular plan masonry wall structure is typical of the Collegiate Gothic style, which was popular at the time. The interior features other Gothic Revival motifs like coats of arms, quatrefoils, and arched ceilings which dominate the hallways and entryway.

Local historians describe the architecture's impressive artistry: "The massive tower entrance to the school on U.S. 41 features brick pier buttresses, which terminated at the top of the tower projection in glazed terra cotta cluster columns. Ornate crocket projections formerly pierced the skyline, but were removed at an unknown date. The tower was ornamented with various combinations of colonettes, crockets, tracery, quatrefoils and bosses, all Gothic Revival motifs, executed in ornamental glazed terra cotta."

Construction
The construction of Sarasota High School was part of a county-wide program which included the erection of South Side School and Bay Haven School. The school expansion program coincided with the land "Boom" upward rise of real estate prices; as a result, the high school site was purchased for $317,000. In The Story of Sarasota, author Karl Grismer commented that the "tract upon which the school was located, cost more than the Florida Mortgage and Investment Company, Ltd., paid for the entire site of Sarasota - and 50,000 acres beside - in 1885!" Bond issues in excess of $1,500,000 were used to float the land acquisition, construction and operating costs required by the school expansion program.

Conversion into the Sarasota Art Museum
After closing the building in 1996, the building was shuttered for many years and left neglected. There were rumors of toxic asbestos and public uproar always followed any attempt to demolish the building. In 2003, plans began to repurpose the building for use as an art museum.

Initial plans for conversion into the Sarasota Museum of Art had been put on hold for a number of years, but the Sarasota Art Museum of Ringling College of Art and Design opened to the public on December 15, 2019.

Current campus
The current campus, consisting of two buildings — a  1926 Collegiate Gothic structure designed by M. Leo Elliott and a  mid-century building by Paul Rudolph added in 1958-1959. The adaptive reuse project was led by Lawson Group Architects.

Activities 
The school offers numerous clubs including: JROTC, Drama Guild, History Club, French Club, Spanish Club, American Sign Language Club, National Honor Society, Student Government, First Priority Christian Club, Lady Sailor Club, Ex Libris Book Club, La Sertoa, Mu Alpha Theta, Rho Kappa, and a Speech & Debate team.

Sports 
Sarasota High School offers numerous sports at the Freshman, JV, and Varsity levels. These sports include cheerleading, marching band, swimming & diving, track & field, wrestling, weight lifting, cross country, basketball, football, softball, golf, sailing, soccer, lacrosse, and baseball.

Sailor Circus 

The world-famous Sarasota High School Sailor Circus began as a mid-game tumbling demonstration during a football game in 1949. The Sailor Circus held their first performance in 1950 as an extension of the PE class at the high school. In celebration of the Circus' 20th anniversary in 1969, the Sailor Circus relocated to an arena right outside the school campus.

It has evolved into a near full-fledged circus of student performers trained and supervised by faculty and parents, some of which are or were professional circus performers. The Sailor Circus has appeared on numerous television programs and has traveled throughout the United States, Japan and Peru. In 1952, Warner Brothers made a 30-minute short on the Sailor Circus which was shown in theaters throughout North America.  Through an agreement with Ringling Brothers Barnum and Bailey Combined Shows, Inc. (Ringling having a long association with Sarasota), the Sailor Circus is officially known as "The Greatest Little Show On Earth".

2009 was the mark of the 60th anniversary of Sailor circus, which is no longer affiliated with Sarasota High School. It is operated by the Circus Arts Conservatory.

Campus 
The school currently has over 2,600 students with 139 teachers and faculty. The campus featuring 19 buildings (5 of them being 2 stories) and 10 portable units (each containing one classroom). There are 2 cafeterias, 2 gymnasiums, 2 locker rooms, a professional weight training room, an auditorium with stage and dressing rooms, a circus arena, 8 tennis courts, 2 baseball/softball diamonds, a football stadium with a track surrounding it, and a soccer field, and 4 parking lots.

Sarasota High features a 1-mile walking path around and through the school.

MaST 
MaST Research Institute is a magnet program at Sarasota High. This program emphasizes in math, science, and engineering.  The main focus of the program is to educate students on the scientific research process and then to have its members complete in-depth research projects over the course of their high school careers.  Students defend their research in a public forum at the end of their senior year at the program's annual science symposium.  Students involved in the MaST Research Institute have won multiple awards for their research, including:  multiple entrants and placement at the INTEL International Science and Engineering Fair, placement at the International ISWEEEP competition, multiple placements (including 1st place) and entrants to the statewide Florida Junior Academy of Science Competition; and multiple entrants and placement in the statewide Junior Science Engineering and Humanities Symposium.  MaST students have attended some of the top Universities in the nation upon graduation, including (but not limited to):  Stanford, Princeton, Harvard, Duke, Dartmouth, Columbia, Georgetown, and Georgia Tech.

AICE 
In the 2011–2012 school year, Sarasota High School started the magnet program AICE, the Advanced International Certificate of Education, a program from Cambridge University in the United Kingdom. The program is new to Florida, but is common through the rest of the world. One of the main reasons of bringing the AICE program to Sarasota High, was to keep the college bound students districted to Sarasota High from going to the International Baccalaureate magnet program at Riverview High School. The goal of the program is to allow students to choose the amount of college prep classes they want, from 1 to all their core classes. The program has 3 main groups (Languages, Humanities and Arts, and Math and Science) and a student will need to take an AICE exam in 6 AICE classes to get a test in each of the 3 groups, and then the other 3 from any area. Students begin taking AICE classes in 9th grade. They take Pre-AICE classes in 9th and some of 10th grade. Sarasota High has replaced honors classes with Pre-AICE classes. A student can get up to 45 college credits with AICE compared with only 10 credits in IB at Riverview High School. If a student completes 100 hours of community service, a student can also receive 100% of the Bright Futures Scholarship Program.

Foreign languages
Sarasota High School offers students the chance to learn Spanish or American Sign Language. Latin used to be offered. Although not a requirement of graduation in Florida, 2 years of a foreign language is required for admission into a state university.

Arts
Sarasota High School has a band, choir, color guard, and drama guild. The band and color guard performs at all the football games and the drama guild also put on plays.

Notable alumni
Fredd Atkins, first African-American mayor of Sarasota and longtime city commissioner
 Joe Ayrault – former professional baseball player (Atlanta Braves) and current minor league manager of the Brevard County Manatees
 Paul Azinger – professional golfer, 1993 PGA Championship winner and winning captain of 2008 Ryder Cup team
 Greg Blosser - former professional baseball player (Boston Red Sox)
 Joe Cash – world champion water skier
 Doug Corbett – former professional baseball player (Minnesota Twins, California Angels, Baltimore Orioles)
 David Daniels – former professional American football player (Seattle Seahawks)
 Ian Desmond – MLB shortstop for the Colorado Rockies
 Jimmy DuBose – former professional football player (Tampa Bay Buccaneers), 1975 SEC Player of the Year,
 Page Dunlap – professional golfer on the LPGA Tour and 1986 NCAA women's champion
 Scott Dunlap – professional golfer on the Champions Tour, class of 1981 valedictorian
 Ken Forssi – bassist with Love, graduated 1962
 Adrian Garrett – former professional baseball player, first Sarasota High alum in MLB (Atlanta Braves, Chicago Cubs, Oakland Athletics, California Angels)
 Wayne Garrett – former professional baseball player (New York Mets, Montreal Expos, St. Louis Cardinals)
 Scooter Gennett – professional baseball player for the Cincinnati Reds
 John-Ford Griffin – former professional baseball player (Toronto Blue Jays)
 Herb Haygood – former professional American football player (Denver Broncos) and college coach graduated 1997
 James Houser - former professional baseball player (Florida Marlins)
 Tim Johnson, former professional American football player (Pittsburgh Steelers)
 Casey Kelly – professional baseball player
 Chris Klaus – technology entrepreneur, founder of Internet Security Systems
 Derek Lilliquist – former professional baseball player (Atlanta Braves, San Diego Padres, Cleveland Indians, Boston Red Sox, Cincinnati Reds)
 Jason Miller – former professional baseball player (Minnesota Twins)
 Doug Million – former high school pitcher of the year and first round draft pick
 Mark Pauline – performance artist, graduated 1970
 Irvin Phillips, former professional American football player (San Diego Chargers)
 Paul Piurowski, former professional American football player (Tampa Bay Bandits)
 Ed Price – state legislator,  graduated 1936
 Barry Redden, former professional American football player (Los Angeles Rams)
Dallas Roberts - actor
 Paul Rubenfeld, aka Pee-Wee Herman – actor, graduated 1970
 Cedric Saunders, former professional American football player (Tampa Bay Buccaneers) and Vice President of Football Operation for the Detroit Lions
 Bobby Seay – former professional baseball player (Tampa Bay Devil Rays, Colorado Rockies, Detroit Tigers)
 Eric Skoglund – MLB pitcher for Kansas City Royals
 Joey Terdoslavich – professional baseball player (Pittsburgh Pirates), graduated 2007
 Skippy Whitaker – retired basketball player (Boston Celtics)
 Hugh Yancy – former professional baseball player (Chicago White Sox)

References

External links 

 
 Max Preps: Sarasota Sailors
 Sarasota County Timeline
 Sarasota High School
 Grand Reunion multi-year classmate reunion website
Cross Country Website
Lady Sailor Soccer Website

High schools in Sarasota County, Florida
National Register of Historic Places in Sarasota County, Florida
Public high schools in Florida
Buildings and structures in Sarasota, Florida
Educational institutions established in 1913
1913 establishments in Florida
School buildings on the National Register of Historic Places in Florida